Joseph Patrick Grace (9 October 1878 – 5 September 1919) was an Australian rules footballer who played with Fitzroy.

Family
The son of Thomas Grace, and Julia Grace, née O'Callaghan, Joseph Patrick Grace was born in Richmond, Victoria on 9 October 1878. He was the brother of Fitzroy footballers Jim Grace and Mick Grace.

He married Annie Jane Smith (1879-1951) in 1905. She later remarried, becoming Mrs. Joseph McCormick. She died at Manly, New South Wales on 16 April 1951.

Death
Employed as an insurance agent, he died in Perth Hospital on 5 September 1919.

Sources

References
Holmesby, Russell & Main, Jim, The Encyclopedia of AFL Footballers: every AFL/VFL player since 1897 (10th ed.), Bas Publishing, (Melbourne, Victoria), 2014. .

External links

1878 births
1919 deaths
Fitzroy Football Club players
Australian rules footballers from Melbourne
People from Richmond, Victoria